Musk, also known as musk oil, is a class of aromatic substances commonly used as base notes in perfumery.

Musk may also refer to:

Places
 Musk, Iran, a village in Iran
 Musk, Ontario, a locality in Ontario, Canada
 Musk, Ontario railway station, in Musk, Ontario, Canada
 Musk, Victoria, a locality in Victoria, Australia
 Musk railway station, a former railway station in Musk, Victoria, Australia

Biology
 MuSK protein, the MuSK receptor

Animals
 Musk beetle, a Eurasian species of longhorn beetle belonging to the subfamily Cerambycinae, tribe Callichromatini
 Musk deer, of the species that make up Moschus
 Musk duck, a highly aquatic, stiff-tailed duck native to southern Australia
 Musk lorikeet, a lorikeet, now the only species in the genus Glossopsitta
 Musk turtle (disambiguation), several aquatic turtles
 Muskrat, a medium-sized semiaquatic rodent native to North America
 Musky rat-kangaroo, a marsupial species found only in the rainforests of northeast Australia
 Muskellunge, North American fish nicknamed the "Musky"

Plants
 Erythranthe moschata, formerly Mimulus moschatus, a yellow-flowered plant known as muskflower or musk
 Musk larkspur (Delphinium brunonianum), a species of larkspur of the family Ranunculaceae
 Musk mallow, various plants from the family Malvaceae
 Musk stork's-bill (Erodium moschatum), a species of flowering plant in the geranium family

People
 Musk family, a prominent South African family
 Elon Musk

Other uses
 Musk (wine), a wine tasting descriptor
 Le Musk, an upcoming Indian virtual reality film directed by A. R. Rahman
 Musk stick, a popular confection in Australia, available from many different suppliers
Musk (film), an upcoming documentary film

See also

 
 
 Musk turtle (disambiguation)
 Carol Muske-Dukes (born 1945) U.S. writer
 Muskie (disambiguation)
 Musc (disambiguation)